OFK Soko is a Serbian football club based in Vranje, Serbia.

Soko Vranje